Rafe Joseph Spall (born 10 March 1983) is an English actor.

Spall has appeared in films including Kidulthood (2006), A Good Year (2006), One Day (2011), Anonymous (2011), Prometheus (2012), Life of Pi (2012), The World's End (2013), The Big Short (2015), The BFG (2016), The Ritual (2017), and Jurassic World: Fallen Kingdom (2018). Spall played the title role of Pete Griffiths in Pete versus Life from 2010–2011, and has portrayed characters on the TV series The Shadow Line and Black Mirror. Spall also appeared in the Men in Black spin-off film Men in Black: International (2019).

Since May 2020, Spall has starred in the Apple TV+ comedy series Trying.

Early life
Spall was born at King's College Hospital in Camberwell, London, the second of three children of Shane (née Baker) and actor Timothy Spall. Named after the protagonist in The Knight of the Burning Pestle, a role his father played in the Royal Shakespeare Company and one he would later play himself, he always had ambitions to act. When he was 14, his father was diagnosed with myeloid leukaemia and spent the next 18 months in treatment. 

Rafe was overweight as a teen, which he calls a "painful" experience. Having achieved poor grades at his school, Haberdashers' Aske's Hatcham College, he left to become an actor and joined the National Youth Theatre at 15. He failed to get into his chosen drama schools, such as RADA, at 17, but worked anyway. After being perennially cast in "fat" roles, he lost 77 lbs (35kg) at age 19, which brought more acting opportunities.

Career
Spall has frequently collaborated with Edgar Wright, appearing in his films Shaun of the Dead, Hot Fuzz and The World's End alongside Simon Pegg and Nick Frost. Spall was also featured in Wright's segment in the 2007 Quentin Tarantino and Robert Rodriguez film Grindhouse.

In 2007, Spall performed for the first time with his father in the ITV adaptation of A Room with a View playing father and son.

In 2011, Spall starred in the romantic tragedy film One Day opposite Anne Hathaway.

In 2012, Spall portrayed Canadian author Yann Martel in the Academy Award-winning drama film Life of Pi, directed by Ang Lee and starring Suraj Sharma and Irrfan Khan. The film was a critical and financial success, winning four Academy Awards and making over $600 million at the box office. In 2013, he played the newlywed husband in I Give It a Year, a comedy about the trials and tribulations of a couple during their first year of marriage.

In 2014, Spall appeared in the coming-of-age drama X+Y, alongside Asa Butterfield and Sally Hawkins, and the seasonal family comedy Get Santa. In 2015, he played John Hancock in the History Channel three-part series, Sons of Liberty, alongside Jim Broadbent, and appeared in the Academy Award-winning biographical comedy-drama The Big Short, alongside Christian Bale, Brad Pitt, Ryan Gosling and Steve Carell. Also that year, Spall played Harry Price in Harry Price: Ghost Hunter, ITV's adaptation of Neil Spring's debut novel, The Ghost Hunters. The film aired on ITV1 on 27 December.

Spall portrayed Eli Mills in Jurassic World: Fallen Kingdom (2018), the fifth instalment of Steven Spielberg's Jurassic Park series, and directed by The Impossible helmer J. A. Bayona.

Since 2020, Spall has a leading role in the Apple TV+ comedy series Trying, opposite Esther Smith and Imelda Staunton. The first season premiered on 1 May 2020. The second season premiered on 12 May 2021.

He also played DS Bailey in the 2020 BBC drama The Salisbury Poisonings.

Personal life
Like his father, he is a keen supporter of Crystal Palace. He is a patron of the Actors' Centre.

In February 2008, Spall met actress Elize du Toit; they were married on 14 August 2010 and live in West Kensington, London. They have three children: a daughter Lena, born 2011, a son Rex, born November 2012 and another son born in 2015.

Filmography

Film

Television

Stage
 To Kill a Mockingbird by Aaron Sorkin at the Gielgud Theatre (2022)
Death of England by Roy Williams and Clint Dyer at the Royal National Theatre (2020)
 Hedda Gabler by Henrik Ibsen at the Royal National Theatre as Brack (2016)
 Betrayal by Harold Pinter at the Ethel Barrymore Theater as Jerry (2013)
 Constellations by Nick Payne at the Royal Court Theatre as Roland (2012)
 If There Is I Haven't Found It Yet by Nick Payne at the Bush Theatre as Terry (2009)
 Hello and Goodbye by Athol Fugard with the English Touring Theatre as Johnny (2008)
 Alaska by DC Moore at the Royal Court Theatre as Frank (2007)
 John Gabriel Borkman by Henrik Ibsen at the Donmar Warehouse as Erhart Borkman (2007)
 The Knight of the Burning Pestle by Francis Beaumont at the Young Vic Theatre/Barbican Theatre as Rafe (2005)
 Just a Bloke by David Watson at the Royal Court Theatre as Nathan (2002)
 A Prayer for Owen Meany by Simon Bent at the National Theatre as Harold Crosby/Coach Chickering/Larry Lish (2002)

Radio 
 Amok Audible.co.uk as Oliver (2015)
 Capital narrator (2012)
 Words and Music: Crushed BBC Radio 3 as a guest reader (2008)
 Hide BBC Radio 3 as the convict (2007)
 The Real Thing BBC Radio 4 as Billy (2006)

References

External links 
 
 Interview about the BBC's The Rotters' Club

1983 births
English male film actors
English male radio actors
English male stage actors
English male television actors
Male actors from London
National Youth Theatre members
Living people
People from Camberwell
21st-century English male actors